North Central State Airport  is a public use airport in Providence County, Rhode Island, United States. The airport is owned by the State of Rhode Island and opened for service in 1951. It is included in the Federal Aviation Administration (FAA) National Plan of Integrated Airport Systems for 2017–2021, in which it is categorized as a local general aviation facility.

The airport is situated in the towns of Smithfield and Lincoln. It is located in the upper region of the state and is roughly horizontally centered in the state, hence the name North Central. It is designated as a reliever airport for general aviation activity from T.F. Green Airport.

North Central State Airport is one of six active airports operated by the Rhode Island Airport Corporation, the other five being T.F. Green State Airport, Quonset State Airport, Westerly State Airport, Newport State Airport, and Block Island State Airport.

Like all state-owned airports in Rhode Island, there is a  landing fee for any aircraft not registered in Rhode Island.

Facilities and aircraft 

It has two asphalt paved runways:

Runway 5/23 is 
Runway 15/33 is 

Runway 5/23 is used more often than Runway 15/33 due to crosswinds.

For the 12-month period ending 30 November 2007, the airport had 27,181 aircraft operations, an average of 74 per day: 99% general aviation, 1% air taxi and <1% military. At that time there were 120 aircraft based at this airport: 92.5% single-engine and 7.5% multi-engine.

It is a non-towered airport catering to private pilots and general aviation; the aircraft seen there are usually either piston or light jet aircraft. The airport is not able to serve large airliners, and the use of North Central for these types of aircraft is purely emergency-related. The airport is the base for a repair facility.

Airlines 
 Angel Flight America Lancaster
 Flight Options Oxford

References

External links
 
 

Airports in Rhode Island
Transportation buildings and structures in Providence County, Rhode Island